Attila Ladinszky nicknamed Le Gitan (The Gypsy) (13 September 1949 – 14 May 2020) was a Hungarian football striker, born in Budapest.

He was top scorer of the Belgian League in 1973/74.
Following his career, he worked as a scout and ran his own Hungarian restaurant in Brussels, where he lived until the mid 1990s, before returning to Hungary.

Ladinszky died in Budapest in May 2020, aged 70.

References

External links
 Attila Ladinszky at ELFvoetbal.nl 
 Attila Ladinszky at Feyenoord-Online.com 
 

1949 births
2020 deaths
Footballers from Budapest
Hungarian footballers
Vasas SC players
Rot-Weiss Essen players
Feyenoord players
R.S.C. Anderlecht players
Real Betis players
K.V. Kortrijk players
Valenciennes FC players
Toulouse FC players
Amarante F.C. players
Eredivisie players
Belgian Pro League players
La Liga players
Ligue 1 players
Ligue 2 players
Segunda Divisão players
Hungarian expatriate footballers
Hungarian expatriate sportspeople in Germany
Expatriate footballers in Germany
Expatriate footballers in Portugal
Hungarian expatriate sportspeople in the Netherlands
Expatriate footballers in the Netherlands
Hungarian expatriate sportspeople in Belgium
Expatriate footballers in Belgium
Hungarian expatriate sportspeople in Spain
Expatriate footballers in Spain
Hungarian expatriate sportspeople in France
Expatriate footballers in France
Association football forwards
FC Tatabánya players